The Johnson Space Center shooting was an incident of hostage taking that occurred on April 20, 2007 in Building 44, the Communication and Tracking Development Laboratory, at the Lyndon B. Johnson Space Center (JSC) in Houston, Texas, United States. The gunman, William Phillips, an employee for Jacobs Engineering who worked at Building 44, shot and killed one person and took a hostage for over three hours before committing suicide. Police said Phillips was under review for poor job performance and he feared being dismissed.

Timeline of events
The situation began at 1:00 p.m. (UTC-5) when gunman William Phillips entered a conference room, pointed a .38 or .357-caliber snub-nosed revolver at one person, and ordered everyone else to leave. He immediately confronted David Beverly about his job review, saying "You're the one who's going to get me fired." The two talked for several minutes. Then, at approximately 1:40 p.m., three gunshots were heard. Police said Beverly was initially shot twice, but he was still alive. Phillips left and then returned seconds later to shoot Beverly twice more.

Phillips then took Fran Crenshaw, who happened to be in the area, hostage and bound her to a chair with duct tape. Phillips barricaded himself and Crenshaw inside the second floor of Building 44 for the next three hours. During this, Crenshaw attempted to calm Phillips, with whom she was reported to have had a positive relationship. Later, Crenshaw was able to get herself out of the tape and alert authorities about what was happening. Meanwhile, SWAT teams surrounded the building. Building 44 as well as four other nearby buildings were evacuated and NASA employees in other buildings were ordered to remain inside their buildings, but were later told they were free to go at the end of the workday. A nearby school, Space Center Intermediate School, was temporarily placed on lockdown.

The incident ended at 5:00 p.m. as the SWAT teams attempted to communicate with Phillips when the gunman committed suicide with a single shot to the head.
Crenshaw was taken to St. John Hospital by ambulance and then released for questioning by the Houston Police Department. She was physically unharmed and walked out of the hospital on her own.

Victims
A person identified as David Beverly was shot four times to the chest and killed. He was a 62-year-old electrical parts specialist employed by NASA. Fran Crenshaw, a contract worker with MRI Technologies, was held hostage by Phillips. During the incident she attempted to calm Phillips, and eventually escaped her bonds.

The perpetrator

The gunman was identified as 60-year-old William A. Phillips, who was known to be unmarried and lived by himself. He was an employee of Jacobs Engineering, and had worked as a NASA contractor for 12 to 13 years. 
Michael Coats, director of the JSC, said Phillips was "until recently, a good employee." Phillips knew the two victims, David Beverly and Fran Crenshaw. Police said there was "some kind of dispute" between Beverly and Phillips, possibly related to a pending review of job performance.

References

External links
JSC shooter lived in fear of losing job
NASAwatch feedback about David Beverly
Church mourn loss of NASA shooting victim
Private memorial held for slain NASA worker

2007 murders in the United States
History of Houston
Hostage taking in the United States
Deaths by firearm in Texas
Murder–suicides in Texas
Murder in Texas
2007 in Texas
Crimes in Houston
Attacks in the United States in 2007
April 2007 events in the United States